State assembly elections were held in Malaysia on 25 April 1964 in all states except Sabah, Sarawak and Singapore.

Results

Johore

Kedah

Kelantan

Malacca

Negri Sembilan

Pahang

Penang

Perak

Perlis

Selangor

Trengganu

References

State elections in Malaysia
State